Sabine Hall is a historic house located near Warsaw in Richmond County, Virginia. Built about 1730 by noted planter, burgess and patriot Landon Carter (1710–1778), it is one of Virginia's finest Georgian brick manor houses. Numerous descendants served in the Virginia General Assembly. It was added to the National Register of Historic Places in 1969, and declared a National Historic Landmark in 1970. At the time of its National Register listing, it was still owned by Carter / Wellford descendants.

Description
Sabine Hall is located in a rural setting south of Warsaw, Virginia, on a ridge overlooking the Rappahannock River to the south. The plantation property on which it stands extends as far east as Jugs Creek, and north and west to United States Route 360. The main plantation house is a two-story, brick and stone, Georgian style manor house. It is flanked by later -story brick wings. The center of its main facade is dominated by a two-story four-column portico with pedimented gable. The house overlooks six gardened terraces descending to the river.

The central core of the plantation house was built by noted planter Landon Carter (1710–1778) in about 1730. In 1764 the house was enlarged to join the kitchen outbuilding (since demolished) via a covered passage. One of the wings was added at an unknown date; the other was added in 1929 to give the building visual symmetry.

History

Landon Carter's firstborn son and heir Robert Wormeley Carter, who would be the first owner to serve in the Virginia House of Delegates finished or remodeled parts of the interior, purchasing cabinetry and other items from William Buckland who built the neighboring Mount Airy for Col. John Tayloe II. His son, another Landon Carter, would marry Tayloe's daughter Catharine Tayloe. His grandson, Robert W. Carter, who would serve in both the Virginia House of Delegates and Virginia Senate before dying at Sabine Hall in October 1861, also remodeled the property in the 1840s and 1850s. His only surviving child, a daughter, married Dr. Armistead Wellford of Fredericksburg, who received a federal pardon at the war's end. Their son, Robert Carter Wellford (1853-1919) would inherit Sabine Hall and also serve in the Virginia House of Delegates.

See also
 List of National Historic Landmarks in Virginia
 National Register of Historic Places listings in Richmond County, Virginia

References

External links
 
 Encyclopedia Virginia: Sabine Hall

Historic American Buildings Survey in Virginia
National Historic Landmarks in Virginia
Houses on the National Register of Historic Places in Virginia
Houses in Richmond County, Virginia
Houses completed in 1735
Carter family residences
Plantation houses in Virginia
Georgian architecture in Virginia
National Register of Historic Places in Richmond County, Virginia